Ayvagediği is a town in Mersin Province, Turkey. (ğ pronounced as gh)

Geography

Ayvagediği is in Toroslar district, the capital of which is actually in Greater Mersin. It is an example of a series of towns called yayla (just like the neighbouring town Gözne), which are used as summer residences for city dwellers in the Mediterranean and Aegean regions of Turkey. The settled (winter) population is 2196 

as of 2011.

Economy
The main agricultural crops are fruits such as grapes, apples, apricots and pears. Another economic activity is domestic tourism or more precisely yayla tourism (active commerce and house rentals during summer months).

References

Yaylas in Turkey
Towns in Turkey
Populated places in Toroslar District
Populated places in Mersin Province